The Defence Centre of Training Support (DCTS) is a training centre of the United Kingdom MOD, located at the Defence Academy of the United Kingdom in Shrivenham, Oxfordshire, UK.

DCTS was established on 1 October 2003. It absorbed the Royal Navy School of Education and Training Technology, the Army School of Training Support and those elements of RAF Halton that had previously been the RAF's Training and Development Support Unit. 

DCTS forms part of the Defence Academy of the United Kingdom. Its mission is to prepare and develop personnel employed to analyze, deliver, design, manage and assure defence training. 

DCTS assures the franchised delivery of Defence Trainer Capability development, provides administration for national examinations and acts as an approved Awarding Centre for national vocational awards in education, training and coaching. It also provides specialist training and consultancy on the Defence Systems Approach to Training (DSAT).

Structure
DCTS has three main departments:
Joint Training Development Team: Embedded with a new Training Optimization Cell, the JTDT is responsible for the analysis, design and creation of course content for all courses delivered by DCTS and its franchises. 
Franchise Development Team: DCTS supports over 20 franchises to train new trainers, training supervisors and managers. The Franchise Development team is responsible for assuring and managing delivery in these areas including the Internal Quality Assurance of accredited qualifications awarded through the Defence Awarding Authority (DAO). 
Training Delivery Group: The DCTS Training Delivery Group is composed of military and Civil Service trainers who deliver a suite of training courses aimed at preparing personnel to analyze, design, deliver, manage and assure Defence Training.

External links 
https://bootcampmilitaryfitnessinstitute.com/what-are-boot-camps/regulations-qualifications/defence-centre-of-training-support/ (reportedly dated mid-2015)

Military training establishments of the United Kingdom
Organizations established in 2003
Organisations based in Buckinghamshire
Defence agencies of the United Kingdom
2003 establishments in the United Kingdom